Stichopogoninae is a subfamily of robber flies in the family Asilidae. There are about 14 genera and at least 230 described species in Stichopogoninae.

Genera
These 14 genera belong to the subfamily Stichopogoninae:

 Afganopogon Hradsky, 1962
 Argyropogon Artigas and Papavero, 1990
 Clinopogon Bezzi, 1910
 Dichropogon Bezzi, 1910
 Eremodromus Zimin, 1928
 Lasiopogon Loew, 1847
 Lissoteles Bezzi, 1910
 Nanoculcita Londt and Copeland, 2017
 Rhadinus Loew, 1856
 Stackelberginia Lehr, 1964
 Stichopogon Loew, 1847
 Townsendia Williston, 1895
 Turkmenomyia Paramonov, 1930
 † Burmapogon Dikow and Grimaldi, 2014

References

Further reading

External links

 

Asilidae
Brachycera subfamilies